Kevin Rempel (born September 15, 1982) is a Canadian sledge hockey player.

Rempel was born in St. Catharines, Ontario, and lists his hometown as Vineland, Ontario. He became an incomplete paraplegic in July 2006, after a dirt bike jumping accident. He began playing sledge hockey in 2008 with the Niagara Thunderblades. He won a gold medal with Team Canada at the 2013 IPC Ice Sledge Hockey World Championships in Goyang, Korea, and a bronze medal at the 2014 Winter Paralympics in Sochi, Russia.

Early life 

Rempel grew up in Vineland, Ontario and lived a very modest life. He enjoyed riding his BMX, skateboarding, snowboarding, and motocross as a child. His passion for motocross began at the age of 10 years old when neighbours down the street received motocross bikes for Christmas and saw the bikes riding in the back fields. Rempel got his first dirtbike at the age of 12.

After trying his hand at racing for a few years, it was apparent that he was not cut out for racing and decided to make a switch to pursue FMX (Freestyle Motocross). After being inspired during an 8-month trip to British Columbia during his college co-op, Rempel returned home to Ontario and started his own company, Underground FMX Productions, to being putting on his own FMX stunt shows.

After performing his first jump show on Canada Day weekend (July 1, 2006), Rempel crashed at his second show in Haliburton, Ontario on July 15, 2006. Rempel claims that he wasn’t fully mentally focused that day riding, and as a result, when he took off on the take off ramp, he wasn’t in the correct body position and decided to let go mid-air and landed on the ground without the motorcycle. The impact broke his back, pelvis, ribs, and he was instantly paralyzed.

Spinal cord injury life 
As a result of the motocross accident, Rempel is an incomplete paraplegic. He suffered a fracture-dislocation of his T12-L1 vertebrae. Luckily, he didn’t sever his spinal cord, and as a result or surgery and therapy he was able to teach himself how to walk again. He still suffers from long terms effects living with a spinal cord injury, such as nerve pain and muscle spasms.

Gerald Rempel 

In addition to Kevin’s accident, his father, Gerald Rempel, also had an accident which resulted in a spinal cord injury. Kevin and Gerald were building a tree stand one day when the branch Gerald was standing on broke, and he fell 25 feet to the ground breaking his back and became a complete paraplegic just nine months from retirement. Unfortunately, Gerald struggled with his spinal cord injury and became very negative, and developed a gambling addiction.

Gerald’s wife, Shirley, eventually left Gerald, not because of his disability, but because of his negative attitude. Seven weeks later Gerald committed suicide. Soon after, while at family counselling, Kevin was asked to share his story of mental resilience and perseverance at a fundraising event for Spinal Cord Injury Ontario. His story was very well received and that is what ultimately started his speaking career.

Team Canada 
Rempel played five years with the Canadian Men’s National Para Ice Hockey Team (2010–2015) helping earn a Gold medal at the 2013 World Championships and a Bronze medal at the 2014 Paralympic Winter Games in Sochi, Russia.

Keynote speaking 
Rempel is now a full-time speaker delivering keynotes and workshops to corporate audiences worldwide. His signature keynote is called The Hero Mindset, which helps audiences focus on small things that make a big difference in order to become a hero in their own movie. Rempel has many different programs available that each focus on mental health, resilience, or change management.

The Sledge Hockey Experience 
Upon retiring from Team Canada, Rempel created a corporate team building program called the Sledge Hockey Experience to help bridge the gap between the able-bodied population and people with disabilities. The program is ran out of the Ford Performance Centre in Etobicoke, Ontario and is a three hour turn-key program designed for a 20 person VIP experience to “Get #buttdown on the ice for a new perspective on sport, life, and people with disabilities.”

References

External links 
 
 

1982 births
Living people
Canadian sledge hockey players
Paralympic sledge hockey players of Canada
Paralympic bronze medalists for Canada
Ice sledge hockey players at the 2010 Winter Paralympics
Ice sledge hockey players at the 2014 Winter Paralympics
Medalists at the 2014 Winter Paralympics
Sportspeople from St. Catharines
Paralympic medalists in sledge hockey